Samuel P. Ziegler (January 4, 1882 — April 7, 1967) was an American university professor, painter, lithographer, and etcher.

Life 
He was the chair of the Art department at Texas Christian University  from 1925 to 1953. His paintings can be seen on the TCU campus and at the Modern Art Museum of Fort Worth.

Further reading

References

1882 births
1967 deaths
People from Lancaster, Pennsylvania
Pennsylvania Academy of the Fine Arts alumni
Texas Christian University alumni
Texas Christian University faculty
American etchers
American lithographers
American male painters
20th-century American painters
20th-century American male artists